Plenty is a village in the Canadian province of Saskatchewan within the Rural Municipality of Winslow No. 319 and Census Division No. 13. Plenty is located equidistant among Kindersley, Biggar, Kerrobert and Rosetown and approximately 150 kilometres southwest of the City of Saskatoon.

History 
Plenty incorporated as a village on March 25, 1911.

The Canadian Pacific Railway (CPR) chose the name Plenty. As the railroad was being laid, the future town site and surrounding areas were the first fields on the line that produced good crops, thus appearing to be "the Land of Plenty", and the town received its name from this inspiration.

This site is on private land.

It is a stopping place for birds and wildlife and covers approximately 1395 hectares. In the 1950s, the area surrounding the lake was made a game preserve to regulate hunting. Opuntia Lake is strategically situated in the major goose fall staging area of Western Canada, is a very important staging area for waterfowl. Estimated maximum fall concentrations include 15,000 to 20,000 geese (Canada, White-fronted, Snow and Ross' geese), up to 30,000 ducks (mainly Mallard, Pintail, and assorted divers), 2,000 Sandhill Cranes and 500 Tundra Swans. The lake supports only a small number of breeding and moulting dabblers and divers.

During the 1950s, a program of tree planting occurred at the lake along with the construction of baseball diamonds and a boat house. For several years the Plenty Sports Day was held at the lake. Several attempts were made to stock the lake with fish but the lakes salinity and fluctuating levels brought an end to this project and the use of the site for the sports day.

In the mid 1970s, a dirt and stock car track was built near the gravel pits at the lake. Although the track was completed, races were never held.

Demographics 

Economy

The economy of Plenty and area is primarily driven by agriculture with some oil and gas activity to the west and south of the town.

Education

Plenty is located within the Sun West School Division. North West Central School, a Kindergarten to grade 12 school, services the surrounding communities of Kelfield, Ruthilda, and Stranraer and provides high school services for the community of Dodsland.

Notable people

Plenty is the home town of the late Brad McCrimmon (1959–2011), former captain of the NHL's Calgary Flames and winner of the Stanley Cup with the Flames in 1989.  It is the birthplace of Brad's brother Kelly McCrimmon, former player, coach and General Manager of the Brandon Wheat Kings and General Manager of the Vegas Golden Knights.

Plenty is also home to Don Saxton who was part of Canada's National Volleyball team for eight years and competed for Canada at the 1983 World Student Games and the 1984 Olympic Games, as well as Jaycee Gebhard, Brynäs IF forward and first-ever draft pick of the NWHL's Toronto Six.

See also 

 List of communities in Saskatchewan
 Villages of Saskatchewan

References

Villages in Saskatchewan
Winslow No. 319, Saskatchewan
Division No. 13, Saskatchewan